Jacques Faure may refer to: 

 Jacques Faure (French Army officer) (1904–1988), French Army general and skier
 Jacques Faure (ambassador), former French co-chair of the OSCE Minsk Group

See also
 Jacques-Paul Faure (1869–1924), head of the French military mission to Japan (1918–1919)